The 2017 Boston Cannons season was the seventeenth season for the Boston Cannons of Major League Lacrosse. The Cannons came in trying to improve upon their 8-6 record in 2016. Although they were one of seven teams tied upon the top of the standings with an 8-6 record, the Cannons were one of three teams not given a playoff berth following tiebreaker procedures.

On December 20, 2016, it was announced that John Tucker would be returning to the Cannons as the team's offensive coordinator in 2017. Tucker was fired mid-season by the expansion team Atlanta Blaze after a 3-7 start.

On June 27, the 3-6 Cannons traded away Will Manny and Joe LoCascio to the New York Lizards for Dave Lawson and Chris LaPierre. On July 14, the Cannons announced that neither Lawson nor LaPierre would suit up for the team that season. Dave Lawson informed team officials that he would be retiring from the league while Chris LaPierre decided not to report to the team. The Cannons did not win another game on the year, finishing a league and franchise-worst 3-11.

Schedule

Regular season

Standings

References

External links
 Team Website

Major League Lacrosse seasons
Boston Cannons